Sporobolus pyramidalis, commonly known as giant rat's tail grass, is a species of grass native to Africa and Yemen. It has become a weed in eastern Australia.

References

pyramidalis
Grasses of Africa
Drought-tolerant plants